David John Hand  (born 30 June 1950 in Peterborough) is a British statistician. His research interests include multivariate statistics, classification methods, pattern recognition, computational statistics and the foundations of statistics. He has written technical books on statistics, data mining, finance, classification methods, and measuring wellbeing, as well as science popularisation books including The Improbability Principle: Why Coincidences, Miracles, and Rare Events Happen Every Day; Dark Data: Why What You Don’t Know Matters; and Statistics: A Very Short Introduction. In 1991 he launched the journal Statistics and Computing, which is now celebrating its third decade.

Education

Career and research
Hand served as professor of statistics at the Open University from 1988 until 1999, when he moved to Imperial College London, where he is now Emeritus Professor of Mathematics. Between 2010 and 2018 he took an extended sabbatical to serve as chief scientific advisor at Winton Capital Management. He served as president of the Royal Statistical Society from 2008 to 2009, then again in 2010 after Bernard Silverman stood down.

Books
Hand has published 31 books, inter alia:
 2001. Principles of Data Mining
 2007. Measurement Theory and Practice: the World Through Quantification 
 2014.  (with Paul Allin). The Wellbeing of Nations: Meaning, Motive and Measurement.  Wiley.
 2014. The Improbability Principle: Why Coincidences, Miracles and Rare Events Happen All the Time
 2020. From GDP to Sustainable Wellbeing: Changing Statistics or Changing Lives? 
 2020. Dark Data: Why What You Don’t Know Matters

Articles
Hand has published over 300 scientific articles, inter alia:

  Hand D.J. and Henley W.E. (1997) Statistical classification methods in consumer credit scoring: a review.  Journal of the Royal Statistical Society, Series A, 160, 523-541
         Hand D.J., Blunt G., Kelly M.G., and Adams N.M. (2000) Data mining for fun and profit. Statistical Science, 15, 111-131
         Hand D.J. and Yu K. (2001) Idiot’s Bayes - not so stupid after all? International Statistical Review, 69, 385-398
         Bolton R.J. and Hand D.J. (2002) Statistical fraud detection: a review. Statistical Science, 17, 235-255  
         Hand D.J. (2006) Classifier technology and the illusion of progress (with discussion). Statistical Science, 21, 1-34
         2008. Top 10 algorithms in data mining
         Hand D.J. (2009) Measuring classifier performance: a coherent alternative to the area under the ROC curve. Machine Learning, 77, 103-123
         Hand D.J. (2018) Statistical challenges of administrative and transaction data (with discussion). Journal of the Royal Statistical Society, Series A, 181, 555-605

Awards and honours
Hand has received various awards for his work, including being elected Honorary Fellow of the Institute of Actuaries in 1999, the Guy Medal in Silver of the Royal Statistical Society in 2002, the IEEE ICDM Outstanding Contributions Award in 2004, the Credit Collections and Risk Award for Contributions to the Credit Industry in 2012, the George Box Medal for Business and Industrial Statistics in 2016, and the International Federation of Classification Societies Research Medal in 2019. He  was appointed Officer of the Order of the British Empire (OBE) in the 2013 New Year Honours for services to research and innovation. He was elected a Fellow of the British Academy (FBA) in 2003.

In April 2013 until June 2021 he served on the board of the board of the UK Statistics Authority as a non-executive director and served on the European Statistical Advisory Committee, advising the European Commission from 2016-2021. He chaired the Administrative Data Research Network from 2014-2017 and serves on many other advisory committees, including chairing the Advisory Board of the ONS’s Centre for Applied Data Ethics and the National Statistician's Expert User Advisory Committee.

References

Living people
1950 births
British statisticians
Officers of the Order of the British Empire
People from Peterborough
Presidents of the Royal Statistical Society
Fellows of the British Academy
Academics of the Open University
Academics of Imperial College London
Alumni of Christ Church, Oxford
Alumni of the University of Southampton
Mathematical statisticians
Computational statisticians
Data miners